pattrice jones  is an American ecofeminist writer, educator, and activist. She is the co-founder of VINE Sanctuary in Springfield, Vermont, an LGBTQ-run farmed-animal sanctuary.

Activism 
jones has been an activist for social change since the 1970s. She stopped eating meat when she was 15, the same year that she came out as a lesbian. She later became vegan, as she felt cows and hens were being sexually exploited for their milk and eggs.

In the year 2000, jones and her partner Miriam Jones founded Eastern Shore Sanctuary in rural Maryland. The sanctuary was relocated to Vermont in 2009, and later renamed to VINE ("Veganism Is the Next Evolution") Sanctuary.

Around 2002–2003, jones was attributed to be the main organizer of the Global Hunger Alliance (GHA), an international network of several activist organizations that was coordinated in preparation for the 2002 World Food Summit. The GHA networked with 90 other "supportive" organizations from around the world, including People for the Ethical Treatment of Animals, Physicians Committee for Responsible Medicine and Uncaged Campaigns.

In 2012, jones became involved in a battle over the lives of Bill and Lou, two oxen at Green Mountain College in Poultney, Vermont. After one of the oxen, Lou, became injured, the school decided to slaughter both and serve them as food in the dining hall. Students and animal rights advocates protested, and jones offered the oxen a home at VINE Sanctuary. The college ultimately euthanized Lou. The controversy made national headlines. Jones wrote about the events in her book, The Oxen at the Intersection.

Writing and lecturing 

jones writes and lectures about animal rights from an intersectional approach, connecting speciesism with racism, sexism, homophobia, and transphobia.

See also 
 Speciesism
 List of animal rights advocates

Selected publications

References

External links 

 VINE Sanctuary

1961 births
Living people
21st-century American women writers
American animal rights scholars
American lesbian writers
American veganism activists
Ecofeminists
Keepers of animal sanctuaries
LGBT people from Maryland
People from Baltimore
People from Springfield, Vermont
Towson University alumni
University of Michigan alumni